Dameron is a variety of French red wine grape.  The term may also refer to:

Dameron (surname) or Damron, a surname of French and Belgian origin:
Dameron, Maryland, a location in the United States
Dameron, West Virginia
Dameron, the main antagonist of the video game Myth: History in the Making
Poe Dameron, a commander and X-wing pilot in the resistance in the Star Wars sequel trilogy